Finn's Girl is a Canadian drama film, directed by Dominique Cardona and Laurie Colbert and released in 2007. The film stars Brooke Johnson as Finn, a medical doctor mourning the recent death of her wife Nancy (Gail Maurice) while continuing to step-parent Nancy's rebellious daughter Zelly (Maya Ritter) and managing an abortion clinic which is being threatened by the increasingly violent protests of the anti-abortion movement.

The film also stars Richard Clarkin as Zelly's father Paul, and Yanna McIntosh and Gilles Lemaire as Diana and Xavier, the police officers helping Finn to protect the clinic.

The film was Cardona and Colbert's first narrative feature film, after making primarily documentaries and short films.

It premiered on June 4, 2007 at the New York Lesbian, Gay, Bisexual, & Transgender Film Festival. It was subsequently screened at Outfest, where it won an award for emerging cinema, and at the Montreal World Film Festival, where it was a nominee for the Golden Zenith Award for Best First Feature.

References

External links

2007 films
2007 LGBT-related films
Canadian drama films
Canadian LGBT-related films
LGBT-related drama films
Lesbian-related films
Films directed by Dominique Cardona and Laurie Colbert
2000s English-language films
2000s Canadian films